Coleophora carmaniae is a moth of the family Coleophoridae.

References

carmaniae
Moths described in 1994